Robert Easton (born 1960 or 1961) is a Canadian retired Paralympic athlete who competed in wheelchair racing. He is a member of the Canadian Paralympic Committee Hall of Fame, the Alberta Sports Hall of Fame and Canadian Cerebral Palsy Sports Hall of Fame.

Easton is from Edmonton, Alberta and has cerebral palsy. He initially played wheelchair basketball prior to taking to wheelchair racing in 1977. An accountant by profession, he later moved to Victoria, British Columbia and  served as Chief Financial Officer for the Ministry of Healthy Living and Sport and as an executive director with the Ministry of Community, Sport and Cultural Development.

References

1960s births
Living people
Canadian male wheelchair racers
Medalists at the 1984 Summer Paralympics
Medalists at the 1988 Summer Paralympics
Paralympic gold medalists for Canada
Paralympic wheelchair racers
Athletes from Edmonton
Alberta Sports Hall of Fame inductees
Paralympic medalists in athletics (track and field)
Athletes (track and field) at the 1984 Summer Paralympics
Athletes (track and field) at the 1988 Summer Paralympics
Paralympic track and field athletes of Canada